Krikor Badrossian was an Armenian communist politician. He was a musician by profession. Badrossian arrived in Baghdad from Lebanon in 1937, where he joined the Iraqi Communist Party. He became a Central Committee member of the party. Badrossian headed the Armenian section of the party. In January 1950 he was arrested, along with many other communist leaders, in a police raid. In 1953 the Iraqi government expelled him to Lebanon.

References

Iraqi Communist Party politicians
Living people
Armenian communists
Year of birth missing (living people)
Place of birth missing (living people)